A machinist calculator is a hand-held calculator programmed with built-in formulas making it easy and quick for machinists to establish speeds, feeds and time without guesswork or conversion charts. Formulas may include revolutions per minute (RPM), surface feet per minute (SFM), inches per minute (IPM), feed per tooth (FPT). A cut time (CT) function takes the user, step-by-step, through a calculation to determine cycle time (execution time) for a given tool motion. Other features may include a metric-English conversion function, a stop watch/timer function and a standard math calculator.

This type of calculator is useful for machinists, programmers, inspectors, estimators, supervisors, and students.

When Handheld Machinist calculators first came to market they were complicated to use due to their small liquid-crystal displays and were fairly expensive with a price of around $70-$80. These older units were missing many features and could not be upgraded. With the invention of the smartphone, Machinist Calculators now have many more features and are ever evolving with constant software upgrades. One popular example of a Machinist calculator is an application called "CNC Machinist Calculator Pro". This machinist calculator has 35 subsections of machining calculations which include turning, milling (machining), drilling, tapping, Grinding (abrasive cutting), gun drilling, GD&T, M-codes, G-codes, thread data, Threading (manufacturing), Position tolerance, bolt circle, surface finish, over wire thread pitch dimensions, center drill dimensions, triangle solver, machinability data with Surface feet per minute (SFM) and RPM conversions, List of materials properties, Brinell scale material hardenability, hardness conversions, scientific calculator functions, etc..

Modern Machinist Speed and Feed Calculators 
Because early Machinist Calculators were limited by the analog user interface and computing power, Speeds and Feeds were fairly rudimentary, most of the time providing speed and feed independently from each other.

Some of the modern Machinist Calculators have departed from the scattered approach to Speeds and Feeds and incorporated selectors for all supported tool types, materials, and tool data input fields on to a single screen, making Speeds and Feeds calculator a first-class citizen.
For example, FSWizard - the first app in its class, contains cutting data for hundreds of work-piece materials and dozens of tool types and allows to calculate Speeds and Feeds with high accuracy and reliability. As a bonus, it contains other useful references to Drill Charts, Geometry Calculators, and so on.

Steps required to accurately calculate Speeds and Feeds include:
 Selecting Work-Piece Material
 Selecting Tool Type, Tool Material and Coating
 Entering Tool Diameter, Tool Stick-out, and Flute Length
 Entering Engagement values, Depth and Width of Cut
With modern GUI these steps take only a few seconds and yield results far greater than having to go through typical trial and error cycle.

References

Calculators
Metalworking tools